Siakh is a village in Dadyal Tehsil of Mirpur District of Azad Kashmir, Pakistan.

Demography 

According to the 1998 census of Pakistan, its population was 2,021.

History 

Like many villages in the Mirpur region, many villagers have emigrated to the United Kingdom and have settled mainly in the City of Birmingham and the Town of Blackburn. The Jats, Mughals, Rajput and the Qazi castes make up the bulk of its population.

A historic village in district Mirpur, Kashmir. the original village was drowned under the waters of Mangla Dam in mid 1960s, the new village was built on the hills of Pel Bakhshi Moti Ram about 1.5 kilometers west of the old village.

References 

Populated places in Mirpur District